Filippo Lora (born 21 November 1993) is an Italian professional footballer who plays as a midfielder for  club Torres.

Club career

Early career
Lora is a product of the A.C. Milan Youth Academy. He joined the U19 squad in 2010, spending three years there. He never made a senior appearance for the club. Before going to Milan, he spent time with Nuova Valdagno, Schio, and Vicenza.

Cittadella
In July 2013, Lora left for Cittadella. In his first season, he helped the club to avoid relegation to the Serie C. His debut and first start came in a 0–0 draw away against Spezia on 24 August 2013. In the 92nd minute, he was given a straight red card. Cittadella would go on to end the match with nine men, with Massimiliano Busellato seeing a second yellow card three minutes after Lora did. His first goal came around two and a half years later, in a 4–2 home victory, following relegation to Serie C, against A.C. Renate on 30 January 2016. His goal was the third of four for his side and came in the 71st minute.

Monza
On 20 November 2018, Monza announced the signing of Filippo Lora from Cittadella on a permanent deal.

Loan to Ravenna
On 29 August 2019, he joined Ravenna on loan.

Lecco
On 30 September 2020, Lora joined Serie C side Lecco on a permanent deal.

Torres
On 10 August 2022, Lora moved to Torres.

References

External links
 Lora at ESPNFC
 Lora at Soccerbase

1993 births
Living people
Italian people of Spanish descent
People from Valdagno
Sportspeople from the Province of Vicenza
Footballers from Veneto
Italian footballers
Association football midfielders
Serie B players
Serie C players
A.C. Milan players
A.S. Cittadella players
A.C. Monza players
Ravenna F.C. players
Calcio Lecco 1912 players
S.E.F. Torres 1903 players